Alfred Morris, Baron Morris of Manchester,  (23 March 1928 – 12 August 2012) was a British Labour Co-operative politician and disability rights campaigner.

Political career

Morris served as Member of Parliament for Manchester Wythenshawe from 1964 until 1997, having previously unsuccessfully fought the, then, safe Conservative seat of Liverpool Garston in 1951 and the Wythenshawe seat in 1959. He served as Parliamentary Private Secretary to Fred Peart, the Agriculture Minister. Morris campaigned against British entry to the Common Market and in May 1967 Prime Minister Harold Wilson sacked him, and six others, for abstaining in a Commons vote on the issue. Fred Peart did not appoint a replacement and Morris continued to work for him, albeit unofficially. In 1968, Peart became Leader of the Commons and reappointed Morris as his Parliamentary Private Secretary.

In 1970 Morris successfully introduced the Chronically Sick and Disabled Persons Act, which was the first in the world to recognise and give rights to people with disabilities. In 1974 he became the first Minister for the Disabled anywhere in the world. In 1991 he introduced a Civil Rights (Disabled Persons) Bill and he led campaigns on Gulf War Syndrome.

He was created a life peer as Lord Morris of Manchester, of Manchester in the County of Greater Manchester, in 1997. He was a life member of the GMB Union, the general trade union of the United Kingdom. He served as President of the 1995 Co-operative Congress.

Background
Morris (one of the eight children of George Henry Morris and his wife Jessie Murphy) was raised in poor circumstances in Ancoats, Manchester.

In 1935, the family left Ancoats and moved to a new housing estate in Newton Heath. He was educated at Brookdale Park School Newton Heath along with Harold Evans, who, as editor of The Sunday Times, wrote a leader saying that: "As time ticked away to the 1970 general election, Alf Morris's Bill was the only piece of legislation worth saving." He received evening school tuition. He worked from the age of 14 as a clerk in the local Wilson's Brewery.

Morris, whose father lost an eye and a leg and was gassed while serving in the First World War, and then suffered a long decline in health and eventual death arising from his injuries, became a campaigner on behalf of those with disabilities. After his father's death, Morris's mother was not entitled to a war widow's pension. Forty years later, Morris himself put the matter right by changing the law affecting armed forces pensions when he became the UK and the World's first Minister for the Disabled.

Morris did his national service in the army, mainly in the Middle East, from 1946 to 1948. He then studied at Ruskin College, Oxford (1949–1950), St Catherine's College, Oxford (BA modern history 1953) and the Department of Education, Manchester University.

Morris worked as a Manchester schoolteacher and university extension lecturer in social history (1954–1956) and as an Industrial relations officer to the Electrical Supply Industry (1956–1964).

Family
He married Irene Jones in 1950. They had two sons and two daughters.

His brother Charles Morris and his niece Estelle Morris have also served as Labour MPs.

Lord Morris died in hospital on Sunday 12 August 2012 after a short illness, aged 84. He was survived by his wife and children.

Awards and honours

 1971 Field Marshel Lord Harding Award for distinguished service to the disabled
 1972 Louis Braille Memorial Award for outstanding service to the blind
 1979 Member of the Privy Council of the United Kingdom
 1989 Companion of the Queen's Service Order for public services, 1989 New Year Honours, New Zealand
 1991 Honorary Officer of the Order of Australia
 1997 University of Salford honorary doctorate
 1997 Life Peer
 1998 University of Manchester honorary doctorate
 2000 Named, with Chrissie Maher and Tim Berners-Lee, "Information Pioneers of the Century" by the UK's National Information Forum.
 2005 MENCAP Lifetime achievement award
 2009 Honorary Fellowship of the Royal College of Physicians and Surgeons of Glasgow and of the Royal College of Physicians

Publications
 The Growth of Parliamentary Scrutiny by Committee (Oxford, Pergamon P., 1970). 
 Needs before Means: an exposition of the underlying purposes of the Chronically Sick and Disabled Persons Act, 1970 (Manchester, Co-operative Union, 1971). 
 No Feet to Drag: report on the disabled (London, Sidgwick and Jackson, 1972).
 Alf Morris: People's Parliamentarian – Scenes from the Life of Lord Morris of Manchester (London, National Information Forum, 2007).

Archives
Catalogue of the papers of Alfred Morris at London School of Economics Archives

See also

References

External links
 

|-

Morris of Manchester
Morris of Manchester
Alumni of Ruskin College
Alumni of St Catherine's College, Oxford
Morris, Alfred
Morris of Manchester
Life peers created by Elizabeth II
Morris of Manchester
Morris of Manchester
Morris of Manchester
Morris, Alfred
Morris, Alfred
Morris, Alfred
Morris, Alfred
Morris, Alfred
Morris, Alfred
Morris, Alfred
Morris, Alfred
Morris, Alfred
People from Ancoats
Morris, Alfred
Morris, Alfred
British disability rights activists
English Roman Catholics